The Sunkar International Ski Jumping Complex (Sunqar halyqaralyq shańǵy tramplınder kesheni) is ski jumping center in Almaty, Kazakhstan. It's located in Gorniy Gigant District in the southern part of the city at an altitude of 900 metres above sea level in a unique place where there is almost no wind.

Sports: ski jumping, Nordic combined. The total area is 15137 km. The length of the large jumps is 125 and 90 meters.

History
In 1956, under the supervision of Eduard Chuprov, a teacher of the Institute of Physical Education, a 55-meter ski jump was restored, and a few years later the first national ski jumping and Nordic combined competitions were held in the Kazakh SSR. The first international competitions with the participation of 9 Soviet republics were held in 1959. Over time, the ski jump fell into disrepair and was destroyed.

The complex was built in 2010 on the site of the old ski jumping complex with 5,500 seating capacity.

For the Nordic World Junior Championships a new track was built at the complex, which meets modern requirements: a tracking system, timing system and lighting. The southern part of the track is asphalted to create both a competition area and a recreation area for citizens.

In 2011-2016, the springboard complex hosted the retro-festival "Alma-Ata - My First Love", becoming a new venue after the Alatau Sanatorium.

Features 
The complex consists of five ski-jumps: K125, K95, and the training ramps K60, K40 and K20. Both artificial turf and snow can be used in every season. The complex also features a permanent multifunctional building with stands for 5,500 seats, a media press centre, a hotel, snowmaking and irrigation systems, a chairlift and underground car park, track and finish area for Nordic Combined, and a helipad.

Events

Men

Ladies

See also

Gorniy Gigant District

References

Sports venues in Kazakhstan
Buildings and structures in Almaty
Sport in Almaty
Skiing in Kazakhstan
Ski jumping venues